The 2015 United States Men's Curling Championship was held from February 14 to 21 at the Wings Stadium in Kalamazoo, Michigan. It was held in conjunction with the 2015 United States Women's Curling Championship. The winning John Shuster rink went on to represent the United States at the 2015 Ford World Men's Curling Championship in Halifax, Nova Scotia.

Teams
Ten teams participated in the 2015 national championship. The teams are listed as follows:

Round-robin standings
Final round-robin standings

Round-robin results
All draw times listed in Eastern Standard Time (UTC−5).

Draw 1
Saturday, February 14, 8:30 pm

Draw 2
Sunday, February 15, 12:00 pm

Draw 3
Sunday, February 15, 8:00 pm

Draw 4
Monday, February 16, 12:00 pm

Draw 5
Monday, February 16, 8:00 pm

Draw 6
Tuesday, February 17, 3:00 pm

Draw 7
Wednesday, February 18, 8:00 am

Draw 8
Wednesday, February 18, 4:00 pm

Draw 9
Thursday, February 19, 8:00 am

Tiebreakers

Round 1
Thursday, February 19, 4:00 pm

Round 2
Thursday, February 19, 8:00 pm

Playoffs

1 vs. 2
Friday, February 20, 12:00 pm

3 vs. 4
Friday, February 20, 12:00 pm

Semifinal
Friday, February 20, 8:00 pm

Final
Saturday, February 21, 3:00 pm

Statistics

Perfect games

References

External links

United States Men's Championship
Sports in Kalamazoo, Michigan
United States Men's Curling Championship
Curling Men's Championship
Curling in Michigan
United States National Curling Championships
Curling Men's Championships